Glenn Bedingfield (born 15 November 1974, Pietà, Malta) is a Member of the Parliament of Malta and Government Whip.

Career
Bedingfield was one of the first journalists to join the newly set up Labour Party owned Super One Radio and Super One Television, One Productions in 1991. As an investigative political journalist Bedingfield won the 2002 Journalist of the Year award for broadcast TV.

Bedingfield is currently serving as the Chairman of the Kottonera Foundation.

Politics
Bedingfield came to the Labour Party fold at the start of the 90s after a journalistic stint with Bay Radio, when he joined One Productions Ltd, Labour's media venture. Since then, he has been involved in politics at district level and he was as a member of the youth section of the Labour Party, the Labour Youth Forum (Forum Żgħażagħ Laburisti) where he served as General Secretary (1996–97). Between 1997 and 2001, he was elected member in the Labour Party national executive. Bedingfield was one of four candidates chosen by Labour Party delegates during an extraordinary general conference held on 18 November 2003. Back then, MEP candidates had to win 70 per cent of valid votes from delegates during the conference. The other chosen MEP candidates were John Attard Montalto and Louis Grech (today MEPs), as well as Joseph Muscat.

Bedingfield contested successfully the local general elections in 2017 and was elected in the Maltese Parliament. Since January 2020, Bedingfield has been serving as a Government Whip.

European Parliament
Bedingfield was elected as a Member of the European Parliament and successor of Joseph Muscat, who relinquished his seat to become Opposition Leader in the House of Representatives. Elected on the first count with 62% of the votes, adding to nearly 20,000 votes, Bedingfield surpassed of the votes. Another 1% of votes were non-transferable. After spending couple of months as a Member of the European Parliament, he lost his position in the MEP elections by 4,982 votes, amounting to 3.67% of Labour votes, or 1.96% of the total votes.

External links
 

1974 births
Living people
Maltese Roman Catholics
Maltese journalists
Maltese people of British descent
Labour Party (Malta) MEPs
MEPs for Malta 2004–2009
People from Pietà, Malta
20th-century Maltese politicians
21st-century Maltese politicians